Mary Alice is an unincorporated community in Harlan County, Kentucky, United States. Its post office closed in November 2011

References

Unincorporated communities in Harlan County, Kentucky
Unincorporated communities in Kentucky
Coal towns in Kentucky